FC Trinity Zlín is a professional football club from Zlín, Czech Republic. The club has spent a number of seasons in the top league of the country, both the Czechoslovak First League and later the Czech First League. They currently play in the Czech First League.

History
The club was founded in 1919 and played at the top level of football between 1938 and 1947, before being disqualified from the league due to manipulation of results. The club then played in the top flight sporadically, just four more seasons before the establishment of a separate Czech league in 1993. The club went on to spend a three-year spell in the Czech First League before returning to the second division in 1996. After regaining promotion to the First Division in 2002, the team recorded a number of steady performances in the league, recording a 7th-place finish twice, in 2003 and 2004, and later finishing 8th in the 2007–08 season.

At the start of the 2008–09 season the team struggled, scoring just 9 points from their opening 16 matches. The club were battling relegation as the season came to a close despite a late run of good form in which they enjoyed an unbeaten run of six matches, including five wins. They needed a win in their last match of the season against Baumit Jablonec to avoid relegation, but conceded after just two minutes, trailing 5–1 at half-time and finally losing by a 6–1 scoreline, their biggest league defeat in 62 years, and dropped out of the Czech First League after seven years in the top flight. The club started the 2010–11 Czech 2. Liga with a sequence of four straight wins, and began the following season with a sequence of six matches undefeated before losing to MFK Karviná in 2011–12 Czech 2. Liga, although they did not manage to sustain their form on either occasion, finishing 11th and 10th respectively. The club marked the start of the 2012–13 Czech 2. Liga by changing their name, manager and captain, bringing in Aleš Křeček to manage the team, installing Tomáš Polách as club captain and signing a five-year deal with firm Fastav, replacing the former sponsorship deal with Tescoma to take the new name FC Fastav Zlín. In May 2017, Zlín won the Czech Cup and subsequently qualified for the group stage of the 2017–18 UEFA Europa League. The club marked the start of the 2022–23 Czech First League by changing their name, signing a three-year deal with firm TRINITY BANK, replacing the former sponsorship deal with Fastav to take the new name FC Trinity Zlín.

Historical names
 1919 – SK Zlín (Sportovní klub Zlín)
 1922 – SK Baťa Zlín (Sportovní klub Baťa Zlín)
 1948 – SK Botostroj I. Zlín (Sportovní klub Botostroj I. Zlín)
 1958 – TJ Gottwaldov (Tělovýchovná jednota Gottwaldov) – merger of Spartak and Jiskra
 1989 – SK Zlín (Sportovní klub Zlín)
 1990 – FC Svit Zlín (Football Club Svit Zlín, a.s.)
 1996 – FC Zlín (Football Club Zlín, a.s.)
 1997 – FK Svit Zlín (Fotbalový klub Svit Zlín, a.s.)
 2001 – FK Zlín (Fotbalový klub Zlín, a.s.)
 2002 – FC Tescoma Zlín (Football Club Tescoma Zlín, a.s.)
 2012 – FC Fastav Zlín (Football Club Fastav Zlín, a.s.)
 2022 – FC Trinity Zlín (Football Club Trinity Zlín, a.s.)

Players

Current squad
.

Out on loan

Notable former players

Reserves
As of 2019/20, the club's reserve team FC Trinity Zlín B plays in the Moravian-Silesian Football League (3rd tier of Czech football system).

Player records in the Czech First League
.
Highlighted players are in the current squad.

Most appearances

Most goals

Most clean sheets

Managers

 Petr Uličný (1990–94)
 Jozef Adamec (1994–95)
 Igor Štefanko (1995)
 Verner Lička (1995–96)
 Igor Štefanko (1996–98)
 František Mikulička (1998–99)
 Antonín Juran (1999)
 Lubomír Jegla (1999–00)
 Bohumil Páník (2000–01)
 František Komňacký (2001–02)
 Vlastislav Mareček (2002–04)
 Vlastimil Palička (2004)
 Pavel Hapal (2004–05)
 Lubomír Blaha (2005–06)
 Petr Uličný (2006)
 Pavel Hoftych (2006–08)
 Josef Mazura (2008)
 Ladislav Minář (2008)
 Stanislav Levý (2008)
 Ladislav Minář (2008–10)
 Marek Kalivoda (2010–11)
 Alois Skácel (2011–12)
 Aleš Křeček (2012)
 Marek Kalivoda (2012–13)
 Alois Skácel (2013)
 Martin Pulpit (2013–14)
 Bohumil Páník (2014–18)
 Vlastimil Petržela (2018)
 Michal Bílek (2018–19)
 Roman Pivarník (2019)
 Jan Kameník (2019)
 Josef Csaplár (2019)
 Jan Kameník (2019–20)
 Bohumil Páník (2020–21)
 Jan Jelínek (2021–22)
 Pavel Vrba  (2022–present)

History in domestic competitions

 Seasons spent at Level 1 of the football league system: 16
 Seasons spent at Level 2 of the football league system: 23
 Seasons spent at Level 3 of the football league system: 0
 Seasons spent at Level 4 of the football league system: 0

Czech Republic

European record

Honours
Czechoslovak Cup/Czech Cup
Winners: 1969–70, 2016–17
Czechoslovak Supercup
Winners: 2017

Club records

Czech First League records
Best position: 6th (2016–17)
Worst position: 15th (1995–96, 2008–09)
Biggest home win: Zlín 5–0 Kladno (2007–08) 
Biggest away win: Slovácko 0–4 Zlín (2018–19)
Biggest home defeat: Zlín 0–5 Žižkov (1994–95)
Biggest away defeat: Slavia Prague 7–1 Zlín (2007–08)

References

External links

 
Football clubs in the Czech Republic
Association football clubs established in 1919
Czechoslovak First League clubs
Czech First League clubs